Edward D. "Chip" Robertson Jr. (born May 1, 1952) is a former chief justice of the Supreme Court of Missouri. Robertson was 33 years old when then-Governor John Ashcroft appointed him to serve on the court, and he served from 1985 to 1998.  His appointment - Ashcroft's first to the high court - led to claims that the non-partisan Missouri Plan for appointing judges was actually a highly partisan process; twenty years later, Robertson would join opposition to Republican efforts to dismantle the system. In 1998 he left the Supreme Court to join a Kansas City firm which led Missouri's lawsuit against tobacco companies.

Electoral politics
As early as 2005, Robertson was rumored to be mulling a challenge to then-Governor Matt Blunt in the 2008 Republican primary, but ultimately declined.

Kevin Strickland case
In 2021, Robertson's assistance was enlisted to help seek the exoneration of Kevin Strickland, who had spent 43 years in prison despite substantial indications of complete innocence of murders committed in a Kansas City home invasion.

References

University of Missouri alumni
Southern Methodist University alumni
Westminster College (Missouri) alumni
Harvard Kennedy School alumni
University of Virginia School of Law alumni
Lawyers from St. Louis
Chief Justices of the Supreme Court of Missouri
1952 births
Living people
Judges of the Supreme Court of Missouri